Prokhorovo is a rural locality (a village) in Sosnovskoye Rural Settlement, Vologodsky District, Vologda Oblast, Russia. The population was 13 as of 2002.

Geography 
Prokhorovo is located 26 km southwest of Vologda (the district's administrative centre) by road. Pirogovo is the nearest rural locality.

References 

Rural localities in Vologodsky District